Macon County High School is located in Montezuma, Georgia, United States, which is a part of Macon County. Enrollment as of the 2017- 2018 school year is 491.

History 
Macon County High School was established in the late 1950s as a school for Caucasians in the area. The school for African Americans was D.F. Douglas High School, which remained open after the desegregation of American school systems. D.F. Douglass abruptly closed in 1998 due to low attendance.

The first principal of Macon County High School was Carl S. Peaster. Wylene Webb, Danny Saunds and Rickey Edmonds also served as principals. Currently, Nakia Parks serves as principal.

As of February 2018, students are being housed in the Macon County Middle School due to the construction of a new and improved Macon County High School, including a new gym.

Alumni 
 Ervin Baldwin, former NFL Defensive End
 Antonio Cochran, former NFL Defensive End
 Roquan Smith, NFL linebacker

External links
Macon County High School

References 

Public high schools in Georgia (U.S. state)
Schools in Macon County, Georgia